Archduchess Charlotte of Austria (1 March 1921 – 23 July 1989) was a daughter of Emperor Charles I of Austria and his wife Princess Zita of Bourbon-Parma. She was also known by the name Charlotte de Bar while a welfare worker in the United States from 1943 to 1956.

Life
Charlotte Hedwig Franziska Josepha Maria Antonia Roberta Ottonia Pia Anna Ignatia Marcus d'Aviano of Habsburg-Lorraine was born in Prangins, Switzerland, where the Austrian imperial family was living in exile following the collapse of the Austro-Hungarian Empire after the First World War. Her family lived in various countries during their exile: after they left Switzerland they went to the Portuguese island of Madeira where her father died a month after her first birthday, having contracted pneumonia. Her sister, Elisabeth was born one month later. They later settled in Belgium before leaving Europe to flee to the United States to escape the Nazis. Having moved to Canada with her family, she obtained a degree in economics from Laval University in 1942 and pursued further education at Fordham University upon returning to the United States.

In 1943 Archduchess Charlotte started work as a welfare worker in Manhattan's East Harlem neighbourhood using the name Charlotte de Bar.

In May 1956, Charlotte became engaged to George, Duke of Mecklenburg and head of the House of Mecklenburg-Strelitz. They were married in a civil ceremony on 21 July 1956 in Pöcking, Germany, followed by a religious ceremony four days later. She left her position as a welfare worker after her marriage. Her husband Duke George died on 6 July 1963 and they had no children.

Archduchess Charlotte died in Munich four months after the death of her mother.

Ancestry

References

External links
Newsreel footage of her wedding to George, Duke of Mecklenburg
Archduchess Charlotte of Austria | House of Mecklenburg-Strelitz

|-

|-

1921 births
1989 deaths
20th-century Austrian people
20th-century Austrian women
House of Habsburg
House of Mecklenburg-Strelitz
Austrian princesses
German royalty
Hereditary Grand Duchesses of Mecklenburg-Strelitz
Université Laval alumni
Fordham Graduate School of Social Service alumni
Austrian Roman Catholics
Swiss Roman Catholics
20th-century Roman Catholics
21st-century Roman Catholics
People from Nyon District
Swiss expatriates in the United States
Daughters of emperors
Children of Charles I of Austria
Daughters of kings